Edgar Hehlen (10 April 1916 – 16 February 2013) was a Swiss racing cyclist. He rode in the 1938 Tour de France.

References

External links
 

1916 births
2013 deaths
Swiss male cyclists